DYHH (864 AM) El-Nuevo Bantay Radyo is an AM station of Sarraga Integrated and Management Corporation, serving as a repeater of DYDD in Cebu City. It is located in Bogo.

In the 1980s, it was formerly occupied by DYSB based on Cebu City, formerly owned by San Miguel Broadcasting Corporation, a subsidiary of San Miguel Corporation.

References

Radio stations in Cebu
Radio stations established in 1991